The Marquesan ground dove (Pampusana rubescens) is a bird species in the family Columbidae. It is endemic to French Polynesia. Its natural habitats are subtropical or tropical dry forests and subtropical or tropical moist shrubland.

It was formerly classified as endangered by the IUCN.

This species was formerly in the genus Alopecoenas Sharpe, 1899, but the name of the genus was changed in 2019 to Pampusana Bonaparte, 1855 as this name has priority.

References

External links
BirdLife Species Factsheet.

Marquesan ground dove
Birds of the Marquesas Islands
Marquesan ground dove
Taxonomy articles created by Polbot
Endemic fauna of French Polynesia
Marquesan ground dove
Endemic birds of French Polynesia
Taxobox binomials not recognized by IUCN